Thirubuvanai() is a village in the union territory of Puducherry, India. It is located in Mannadipet commune panchayat of the Villianur taluk. It serves as the centre of Thirubuvanai (Union Territory Assembly constituency). It also hosts a Dodadrinath temple(Sri Thenkalai Varadharaja Perumal Temple)built by Parantaka-1 in the 10th century and Vadukeeswarar temple. It also has a primary health centre, police station and fire station.

Sri Thenkalai Varadharaja Perumal Temple

The antiquity of the village goes back to the times of Paranthaga Cholan 1(907-955 AD) who built the Varadharaja Perumal temple. It was called as Veeranarayana Vinnagaram after the title of Paranthagar I. The old name of the village was Tirubuvanai Mahadevi Chadurvedi Mangalam, named after the Paranthagar's Queen. The lake of this village was called Kokkilanadi-Pereri, named after another wife of Paranthagar. This is an AEL stone temple displaying the characteristic plinth mouldings, niches and pilasters. There are small but interesting panels around the sanctum depicting scenes from Ramayana and Bhagavata. There are a number of Chola inscriptions in this temple throwing light on the political, social and cultural life of the village. The temple is managed by ASI.

Thirubuvanai Police Station
The police station situated at a distance of 22 km from Headquarters lies on the Villupuram Main Road (NH 45A).  It is the west border police station in the Union Territory of Pondicherry. The building was inaugurated by His Excellency H.L Khurana, Governor of Tamil Nadu and Administrator of Pondicherry on 2 June 1984. The police station building contains one S.I Quarter, three H.C’s Quarters and thirteen P.C’s Quarters.

Schools
Govt. High School Thirubuvanai (அரசு உயர் நிலை பள்ளி, திருபுவனை) was Established in 1929. The School is managed by Government of Pondicherry Education Department.
 FSDA English Higher Secondary School
 Swami Vivekananda Higher Secondary School
 Kalaimagal English High School Thirubuvanai

Transport

Road
Thirubuvanai is situated in the midway of the Pondicherry to Villupuram NH45 road. There are several private buses running on daily basis from Thirubuvanai to Pondicherry. The Pondicherry Road Transport Corporation and The Tamil Nadu State Transport Corporation operates bus services from Pondicherry to Villupuram via Thirubuvanai.

Train
There is no train service available to Thirubuvanai. But one can reach ChinnababuSamuthiram railway station, and or Villupuram railway station which are located around 4 kilometer towards East and 17 km towards west from Thirubuvanai. Daily train services are available from Pondicherry to Villupuram junction via Chinnababu Samuthiram railway station.

Festivals
Sedal Festival(செடல் திருவிழா) at Sri Pazhandi Mariyamman Kovil
Opening the door of paradise(சொர்க வாசல் திறப்பு) at Sri Thenkalai Varadharaja Perumal Kovil

Industries

Member of Legislative Assembly 

 1974: A. Gopal, Indian National Congress
 1977: M. Maniyam, All India Anna Dravida Munnetra Kazhagam
 1980: P. Cattavarayane, Indian National Congress (I)
 1985: S. Komala, Dravida Munnetra Kazhagam
 1990: D. Viswanathan, All India Anna Dravida Munnetra Kazhagam
 1991: D. Viswanathan, All India Anna Dravida Munnetra Kazhagam
 1996: S. Arasi, All India Anna Dravida Munnetra Kazhagam
 2001: P. Angalan, Indian National Congress
 2006: Angalane, Indian National Congress
 2011: P. Angalane, All India N.R. Congress
 2016: B. Kobiga, All India N.R. Congress

Gallery

Notes

Villages in Puducherry district